is the founder of Shiatsu therapy.

Biography
At the age of seven, he discovered His manual therapy pressure method while treating his mother's rheumatoid arthritis. He named this method "Shiatsu".

In 1940, he established the Japan Shiatsu College in Tokyo. Many of his graduates now practice in Japan and overseas. Some of these graduates have popularized their own styles, called Derivative Shiatsu, such as Tadashi Izawa of Meridian Shiatsu and Shizuto Masunaga of Zen Shiatsu. Also Hiroshi Nozaki who began the Hiron Shiatsu branch which is a holistic school of Shiatsu popular in Switzerland, France and Italy. Namikoshi also established the Japan Shiatsu Association in 1947. He died at age 95 in 2000.

References

External links
Important Dates in the History of Namikoshi Shiatsu

1905 births
2000 deaths
Shiatsu
People from Kagawa Prefecture